The Sturgeon River is a river of Minnesota, located in Koochiching County near Big Falls.  It is a tributary of the Big Fork River.

Sturgeon River was named for its lake sturgeon.

See also
List of rivers of Minnesota

References

Minnesota Watersheds
USGS Geographic Names Information Service
USGS Hydrologic Unit Map - State of Minnesota (1974)

Rivers of Minnesota
Rivers of Koochiching County, Minnesota